Cuôr Knia is a rural commune (xã) in the Buôn Đôn District of Đắk Lắk Province, Vietnam, not far from the Cambodia border. The commune covers an area of 77.28 square kilometres and as of 2001 had a population of 16,215 people.

References

Communes of Đắk Lắk province
Populated places in Đắk Lắk province